During the Parade of Nations portion of the 1996 Summer Olympics opening ceremony, athletes from each country participating in the Olympics paraded in the arena, preceded by their flag. The flag was borne by a sportsperson from that country chosen either by the National Olympic Committee or by the athletes themselves to represent their country.

Parade order
As the nation of the first modern Olympic Games, Greece entered the stadium first; whereas, the host nation of the United States marched last. Other countries entered in alphabetical order in the language of the host country (English), according with tradition and IOC guidelines.

Whilst most countries entered under their short names, a few entered under more formal or alternative names, mostly due to political and naming disputes. Macedonia entered as "The Former Yugoslav Republic of Macedonia'" because of the naming dispute with Greece. The Republic of China (commonly known as Taiwan) entered with the compromised name and flag of "Chinese Taipei" under T so that they did not enter together with conflicting People's Republic of China (commonly known as China), which entered as the "People's Republic of China" under C. The Republic of the Congo entered as just "Congo" while the Democratic Republic of Congo entered under its former name, Zaire. Iran, Moldova, Laos, Brunei and the United States all entered under their formal names, respectively "Islamic Republic of Iran", "Republic of Moldova", "Lao People's Democratic Republic", "Brunei Darussalam" and "United States of America".

A record of 197 nations entered the stadium with a combined total of 10,318 athletes. Twenty-three nations made their Olympic debut, including ten of the former Soviet republics, namely Armenia, Azerbaijan, Belarus, Georgia, Kazakhstan, Kyrgyzstan, Moldova, Tajikistan, Turkmenistan, Ukraine, and Uzbekistan, that had previously competed as part of the Unified Team in 1992 and Soviet Union before that. Russia competed independently for the first time since 1912. Czech Republic and Slovakia attended the Games independently for the first time since the breakup of Czechoslovakia in 1993, whereas Cambodia returned officially after its 24-year absence under the Khmer Republic.

Notable flag bearers in the opening ceremony featured the following athletes: weightlifter Pyrros Dimas (Greece); eventing rider Andrew Hoy (Australia); nine-time Olympian and Star sailor Hubert Raudaschl (Austria); 1984 Olympic middle-distance champion Joaquim Cruz (Brazil) in the 800 metres; track sprinters Charmaine Crooks (Canada) and Marie-José Pérec (France); defending Olympic long-distance champions Derartu Tulu (Ethiopia) and Khalid Skah (Morocco), both in the 10,000 metres; fencers Arnd Schmitt (Germany), Bence Szabó (Hungary), and Giovanna Trillini (Italy); rowing legend Steve Redgrave (Great Britain); swimmers Raimundas Mažuolis (Lithuania) in sprint freestyle and Rafał Szukała (Poland) in the butterfly; windsurfer Barbara Kendall (New Zealand); hurdler and world champion Brigita Bukovec (Slovenia); defending Olympic champions Jan-Ove Waldner (Sweden) in men's table tennis singles, and Andrey Abduvaliyev (Tajikistan) in the hammer throw; pole vaulter and world record holder Sergey Bubka (Ukraine); and super heavyweight wrestlers Alexander Karelin (Russia) in Greco-Roman, and Bruce Baumgartner (United States) in freestyle.

List
The following is a list of each country's announced flag bearer. The list is sorted by the order in which each nation appears in the parade of nations. The names are given in their official designations by the IOC.

References

See also
 1992 Summer Olympics national flag bearers
 2000 Summer Olympics national flag bearers
 1994 Winter Olympics national flag bearers

Flag bearers
Lists of Olympic flag bearers